Bestine may refer to:
 Bestine, commercially available solvent and thinner (heptane), used primarily for thinning rubber cement and removing non-water-based inks.
 Bestine, a township on the fictional planet Tatooine in the Star Wars universe.

it:Pianeti di Guerre stellari#Bestine